Quartz Creek might refer to:

Quartz Creek (British Columbia), a stream in British Columbia, Canada
Quartz Creek (California)
Quartz Creek (Gunnison County, Colorado)
Quartz Creek (Western Australia)
Quartz Creek (Yukon), a stream in the Klondike region of Yukon, Canada